The nuclear weapons tests of the United States were performed from 1945 to 1992 as part of the nuclear arms race. The United States conducted around 1,054 nuclear tests by official count, including 216 atmospheric, underwater, and space tests. Most of the tests took place at the Nevada Test Site (NNSS/NTS) and the Pacific Proving Grounds in the Marshall Islands and off Kiritimati Island in the Pacific, plus three in the Atlantic Ocean. Ten other tests took place at various locations in the United States, including Alaska, Nevada other than the NNSS/NTS, Colorado, Mississippi, and New Mexico.

United States nuclear tests

Timeline
Graphical timeline of United States atmospheric nuclear weapons tests.

Notes

References

Sources

 
 
 

Nuclear technology-related lists